Bjørn Fongaard (2 March 1919 in  Oslo – 26 October 1980 in Oslo) was a Norwegian composer, guitarist, and teacher. In addition to being concerned with microtonal and electronic music, he was perhaps the first to use the prepared guitar. "Fongaard's output is considerable...Due to the partly experimental notation, these works have not become widely known."

Life
Fongaard grew up in the Oslo borough of Nordstrand. He studied at the Oslo Conservatory of Music with teachers including Per Steenberg, Sigurd Islandsmoen, Bjarne Brustad, and Karl Andersen. He started off by constructing a quarter tone guitar with adaption of the fretboard, but very early left this in favor of a diverse set of prepared guitar techniques. His first pieces in this genre came in the mid 60's. A sampler CD of his own recordings entitled Elektrofoni: Works For Micro Intervallic Guitar 1965-1978  was released in 2011. In 2015, a double disc of new recordings by Norwegian guitarist Anders Førisdal was released on Aurora Records.

List of works
Galaxy op. 46
Homo Sapiens op. 80
Genesis
Sinfonia Microtonalis op. 79
Orchestra Antiphonalis
Symphony of Space
Universum
Mare Tranquilitatis
23 Concertos for Piano and Orchestra 0p. 118
12 Concertos for Solo Instrument and Orchestra op. 120
21 String Quartets op. 123
57 Sonatas for One Instrument op. 125
41 Concertos for Solo Instrument and Tape op. 131

References

External links
"Bjørn Fongaard: Elektrofoni 3CD/1DVD Box-Set", PrismaRecords.BlogSpot.com.
"Bjørn Fongaard, "Elektrofoni: Works for Micro Intervallic Guitar 1965-1978"", BrainWashed.com.

1919 births
1980 deaths
20th-century classical composers
Norwegian classical composers
Norwegian guitarists
Norwegian male guitarists
Norwegian male classical composers
Oslo Conservatory of Music alumni
20th-century guitarists
20th-century Norwegian male musicians